Sébastien Betbeder (born 4 January 1975) is a French film director. He has directed more than ten films since 2003.

Selected filmography

References

External links 

1975 births
Living people
French film directors